Alex Stein (born 1985) is an American right-wing YouTube personality known for disrupting local government meetings and confronting politicians. In February 2023 he became host of Prime Time with Alex Stein on Glenn Beck's Blaze Media network.

Early life 
Stein was born to Kelly Stein and Rhett Stein, a bail bondsman. Stein grew up in Dallas, Texas. He is Jewish, but told the Jewish Journal that he did not get a bar mitzvah "or any of the cool Jewish stuff as a kid". Stein described being "obsessed with spy stuff" as a child, which he said led to his enjoyment of conspiracy theories.

Stein went to Highland Park High School in University Park, Texas. After high school, he attended LSU.

Stein moved to Los Angeles after graduating college to pursue a comedy career. He later moved back to Dallas and worked at selling used cars with his father.

Career 
Stein began his career in 2011 by producing and participating in food challenge videos on YouTube.

In 2012, Stein was a contestant in the reality TV show The Glass House, in which he described himself as having "no shame", asked viewers, "Should I turn into the most epic villain in the history of reality TV?", and was the first to be voted off. He appeared on Season 4 of Worst Cooks in America on Bobby Flay's team in 2013.

Stein became known for disrupting local government meetings, sometimes virtually, during the COVID-19 pandemic. Stein said he began the disruptions after being frustrated by Dallas government unresponsiveness. His first video, posted in September 2021, involved speaking in Dallas about abortion bans. His disruption of various other local government meetings including New York City and Las Vegas has included rapping about vaccines and other topics. He rapped about the Russo-Ukrainian War at a city council meeting in Plano, Texas. D Magazine described Stein's city council pranks as "mostly harmless, if at times in poor taste" and said that publicity from the videos had gained Stein access to "larger right-wing platforms where he can spread misinformation, transphobia, and conspiracy theories".

In June 2022, Stein began confronting politicians including Rep. Alexandria Ocasio-Cortez, Sen. Ted Cruz, Rep. Dan Crenshaw, Beto O'Rourke, Rep. Adam Kinzinger, and Rep. Eric Swalwell. He was described as harassing Ocasio-Cortez on the steps of the U.S. Capitol in July 2022 by calling her a "big booty Latina" and accusing her of wanting to "kill babies". He told Kinzinger that he was a "d-bag". He called Crenshaw a "globalist RINO"; Crenshaw compared Stein to an angry little boy in a tweet after the confrontation.

In August 2022, Stein hosted a "Big Juicy Booty Fest" in Austin, Texas, while wearing women's swimming attire with young children in attendance. In October 2022, an event featuring Stein and Proud Boys founder Gavin McInnes that had been scheduled by the group Uncensored America at Penn State University was cancelled by the university at the last minute after protests and confrontations; Stein taunted protesters and was spit on by one. In December 2022, Stein and a half-dressed man he called his "wife’s boyfriend" broke into the lobby of Barstool Sports and were forcefully removed by security.

Stein has been a guest on Tucker Carlson Tonight, Alex Jones’ InfoWars, Tim Pool's TimCast IRL, Kevin Brennan's Misery Loves Company podcast, and Gavin McInnes' Censored.TV network.  He posts video content to YouTube and Instagram. As of February 2022 he hosted an online show called Conspiracy Castle.

Stein has cited Andy Kaufman as a comedic influence. He said in his comedy set that "I like to jam the most absurd parts of our culture into people's faces".

Prime Time with Alex Stein 
On February 8, 2023, Stein debuted Prime Time with Alex Stein on the American conservative media network Blaze Media. The show's guests have included Marjorie Taylor Greene, Gavin McInnes, Michele Tafoya, and Andy Ngo.

Views 
Stein's politics have been described as right-wing and alt-right; Stein himself has identified as a populist and a centrist. He is pro-life. He opposes illegal immigration. He has criticized vaccine mandates, mask ordinances, and lockdowns. Stein has said he favors socializing the healthcare system.

Personal life 
Stein has said that he believes in God but not organized religion. He often refers to himself as "Primetime99" and a "pimp on a blimp".

Stein's mother, Kelly Stein, died of COVID-19 in October 2021. Stein's father said Stein's experience of watching his mother get extubated "traumatized him" and "totally broke him down". Stein said the hospital's use of the antiviral drug remdesivir had caused his mother's death.

Notes

References

External Links

American YouTubers
Internet trolls
Blaze Media people
Comedy YouTubers
Jewish American male comedians
Living people
People from Dallas
American male comedians
1985 births
21st-century American comedians
YouTube podcasters
YouTube vloggers